Marie Lenotre (born 1945) is a French-American higher education administrator and the co-founder and director of the Culinary Institute Lenotre.

Lenotre is married to Alain Lenotre. The couple co-founded the Culinary Institute Lenotre in 1998.

Lenotre is the author of Appetites, a Memoir. In her book, she writes about her life with Alain Lenotre, their business history and their journey to the United States.

Education 
Marie Lenotre has a bachelor's degree in drama from the University of Athens in Greece, a bachelor's degree in psychology and a master's degree in English and creative writing both from the University of Houston. She also holds a master's degree in public health education from the University of Texas.

Philanthropy 
Lenotre is the founder and president of the Gaston Lenotre Scholarship, a nonprofit that raises scholarship funds for underprivileged students who wish to aspire to a culinary career.

She is the previous president of the Houston chapter of Les Dames d'Escoffier.

Lenotre is a member of the board of trustees of the Moores School of Music.

Awards 
In October 2011, LeNôtre was awarded by the Government of France with the Order of Merit at an event officiated by Daniel Boulud and in the presence of Thomas Keller and Jérôme Bocuse.

References 

Living people
National and Kapodistrian University of Athens alumni
University of Houston alumni
University of Texas alumni
American women philanthropists
Recipients of the Ordre national du Mérite
1945 births